St. Paul('s) Academy may refer to:
St. Paul's R.C. Academy, a high school in Dundee, Scotland
St. Paul's Preparatory Academy, a defunct school in Phoenix, Arizona, United States
St. Paul Academy and Summit School, an independent school in St. Paul, Minnesota, United States
St. Paul Christian Academy, an independent school in Nashville, Tennessee, United States
St Paul's Academy, Abbey Wood, a secondary school in Abbey Wood, London, England